Marcel Hansenne (January 24, 1917  – March 22, 2002) was a French middle distance runner, who won the bronze medal at the 1948 Summer Olympics in London over 800 m in a time of 1:49.8 min. The race was won by Mal Whitfield. Hansenne also equalled Rune Gustafsson's 1000 m world record of 2:21.4 in Gothenburg in 1948. Hansenne was born in Tourcoing.

References

1917 births
2002 deaths
Sportspeople from Tourcoing
Athletes (track and field) at the 1948 Summer Olympics
French male middle-distance runners
Olympic bronze medalists for France
Olympic athletes of France
European Athletics Championships medalists
Medalists at the 1948 Summer Olympics
Olympic bronze medalists in athletics (track and field)